Jeffrey Michael Curran (born September 2, 1977) is an American retired professional mixed martial artist. A professional competitor since 1998, Curran has fought at a number of different weight classes for a large number of promotions including Bellator, the UFC, Strikeforce, PRIDE Fighting Championships, WEC, IFL, the RFA, and KOTC.

Background
Curran started his path towards mixed martial arts with karate and Tae Kwon Do when he was five years old. Curran has trained for 16 years and has fought for 5 years. He began wrestling in the fourth grade and did that until his freshman year when he began Brazilian jiu-jitsu. He graduated from Woodstock High School (Illinois) in 1995. Curran also says that as a teen he would box with his grandfather. Curran holds a rank of fourth-degree black belt under Pedro Sauer. Curran is also known as one of the most technical instructors in the Pedro Sauer Jiu-Jitsu Association.

Curran is president and head instructor of Curran Martial Arts Academy (CMA), and owner and promoter of Xtreme Fighting Organization. Curran appeared on the television series Tapout on Versus with fellow Team Curran pro fighter Matt Fiordirosa.

World Extreme Cagefighting
After fifteen victories in sixteen fights, Curran fought Urijah Faber for the WEC featherweight championship. Faber retained his title by defeating Curran via guillotine choke. Curran then lost a pair of unanimous decisions, first to former WEC Featherweight Champion Mike Brown and then his Bantamweight debut to Joseph Benavidez at WEC 40.  His most recent WEC fight was against  Takeya Mizugaki on August 9, 2009, WEC 42; he lost by a split decision, and was subsequently released from the promotion for good.

Independent promotions
After losing four consecutive fights in the WEC, it was announced on October 20, 2009, that Curran had signed a two-fight contract with North American promotion Strikeforce. He maintained that his ultimate goal was to return to the WEC, but was glad to still be able to fight on major cards for the time being. He made his debut for the organization as a part of the preliminary card on their November 7 event, Strikeforce: Fedor vs. Rogers, in Chicago, winning over Dustin Neace by submission in the first round. Curran later defeated Tomohiko Hori via unanimous decision at XFO 34. Curran went on to lose a unanimous decision to Bryan Goldsby in a non-tournament bantamweight bout at Bellator 14.

Curran announced that he will be featured in a documentary entitled "This is the Fight". It was expected to be released in early fall 2010. The film will be about his difficult road to try to make it back to the WEC after 4 consecutive losses to, at the time, top 5 fighters in his weight class.

Curran faced David Love at XFO 37 on December 4, 2010. Although breaking his right forearm towards the end of the fight, he won the fight by unanimous decision. He underwent surgery for the injury on New Year's Day 2011.

Curran was scheduled to headline XFO 39 on May 13 at the Sears Centre in Hoffman Estates, Illinois.  He took on late replacement Billy Vaughan  and won via unanimous decision.

UFC return
Curran in July 2011 signed a new multi-fight contract to return to the UFC. His first fight back was against Scott Jorgensen, who was ranked the No. 4 bantamweight in the world by MMAWeekly.com at the time that Curran returned to the promotion. Curran lost by unanimous decision.

Curran faced Johnny Eduardo on May 15, 2012, at UFC on Fuel TV: Korean Zombie vs. Poirier. He lost the bout via unanimous decision and was subsequently released from the promotion.

Resurrection Fighting Alliance 
On April 29, 2013, it was announced that Resurrection Fighting Alliance (RFA) next card would headline Jeff Curran and Sergio Pettis for the inaugural RFA flyweight championship.  However, in the days leading up to the event, Curran was forced out due to personal reasons and was replaced by Dillard "Joe" Pegg.

On July 20, 2013, it was announced that Keoni Koch was injured and pulled from the main event of RFA 9; Curran was then set to face Pedro Munhoz at RFA 9 on August 16, 2013, in the main event for the RFA Bantamweight Championship. Curran lost the bout via split decision and announced his retirement.

Titan Fighting Championship
On January 28, 2014, it was announced that Curran would return from his retirement to fight for Titan Fighting Championship; he was to take on fellow UFC vet Iliarde Santos in April.

Personal life
Jeff and his wife Sarah have two sons, Ty (born 2007) and Jacob (born 2008). Jeff opened up his own gym facility in 2018, where he was coaching Felice Herrig for her comeback but was forced to close it in 2020 due to financial complications resulting from COVID-19.

Championships and accomplishments
Ironheart Crown
IHC Featherweight Championship (1 Time, First, Last)
Shooto
Shooto Americas Lightweight Championship (1 Time)

Mixed martial arts record

|-
| Loss
| align=center| 36–18–1
| Raufeon Stots
| Decision (unanimous)
| VFC 53: Curran vs. Stots
| 
| align=center| 3
| align=center| 5:00
| Waterloo, Iowa, United States
|
|-
| Loss
| align=center| 36–17–1
| Melvin Blumer
| KO (backfist)
| RFA 24: Smith vs. Romero
| 
| align=center| 1
| align=center| 4:58
| Prior Lake, Minnesota, United States
|
|-
| Loss
| align=center| 36–16–1
| Pedro Munhoz
| Decision (split)
| RFA 9: Munhoz vs. Curran
| 
| align=center| 5
| align=center| 5:00
| Los Angeles, California, United States
| 
|-
| Win
| align=center| 36–15–1
| Josh Killion
| Decision (unanimous)
| Extreme Challenge 227
| 
| align=center| 3
| align=center| 5:00
| Bettendorf, Iowa, United States
| 
|-
| Loss
| align=center| 35–15–1
| Johnny Eduardo
| Decision (unanimous)
| UFC on Fuel TV: Korean Zombie vs. Poirier
| 
| align=center| 3
| align=center| 5:00
| Fairfax, Virginia, United States
| 
|-
| Loss
| align=center| 35–14–1
| Scott Jorgensen
| Decision (unanimous)
| UFC 137
| 
| align=center| 3
| align=center| 5:00
| Las Vegas, Nevada, United States
| 
|-
| Win
| align=center| 35–13–1
| Billy Vaughan
| Decision (unanimous)
| Xtreme Fighting Organization 39
| 
| align=center| 3
| align=center| 5:00
| Hoffman Estates, Illinois, United States
| 
|-
| Win
| align=center| 34–13–1
| David Love
| Decision (unanimous)
| Xtreme Fighting Organization 37
| 
| align=center| 3
| align=center| 5:00
| Lakemoor, Illinois, United States
| 
|-
| Loss
| align=center| 33–13–1
| Bryan Goldsby
| Decision (unanimous)
| Bellator 14
| 
| align=center| 3
| align=center| 5:00
| Chicago, Illinois, United States
| 
|-
| Win
| align=center| 33–12–1
| Tomohiko Hori
| Decision (unanimous)
| XFO 34: Curran vs. Hori
| 
| align=center| 3
| align=center| 5:00
| Lakemoor, Illinois, United States
| 
|-
| Win
| align=center| 32–12–1
| Dustin Neace
| Submission (rib injury) 
| Strikeforce: Fedor vs. Rogers
| 
| align=center| 1
| align=center| 1:39
| Hoffman Estates, Illinois, United States
| 
|-
| Loss
| align=center| 31–12–1
| Takeya Mizugaki
| Decision (split)
| WEC 42
| 
| align=center| 3
| align=center| 5:00
| Las Vegas, Nevada, United States
| 
|-
| Loss
| align=center| 31–11–1
| Joseph Benavidez
| Decision (unanimous)
| WEC 40
| 
| align=center| 3
| align=center| 5:00
| Chicago, Illinois, United States
| 
|-
| Loss
| align=center| 31–10–1
| Mike Brown
| Decision (unanimous)
| WEC 34: Faber vs. Pulver
| 
| align=center| 3
| align=center| 5:00
| Sacramento, California, United States
| 
|-
| Loss
| align=center| 31–9–1
| Urijah Faber
| Submission (guillotine choke)
| WEC 31
| 
| align=center| 2
| align=center| 4:34
| Las Vegas, Nevada, United States
| 
|-
| Win
| align=center| 31–8–1
| Stephen Ledbetter
| Decision (unanimous)
| WEC 29
| 
| align=center| 3
| align=center| 5:00
| Las Vegas, Nevada, United States
| 
|-
| Win
| align=center| 30–8–1
| John Mahlow
| Decision (split)
| KOTC: Damage Control
| 
| align=center| 3
| align=center| 5:00
| Chicago, Illinois, United States
| 
|-
| Win
| align=center| 29–8–1
| Kevin English
| Submission (guillotine choke)
| IFL: Moline
| 
| align=center| 2
| align=center| 1:12
| Moline, Illinois, United States
| 
|-
| Win
| align=center| 28–8–1
| Donny Walker
| Submission (rear-naked choke)
| KOTC: Hard Knocks
| 
| align=center| 3
| align=center| 3:23
| Rockford, Illinois, United States
| 
|-
| Win
| align=center| 27–8–1
| Raphael Assunção
| Decision (majority)
| XFO 13: Operation Beatdown
| 
| align=center| 3
| align=center| 5:00
| Hoffman Estates, Illinois, United States
| 
|-
| Win
| align=center| 26–8–1
| Wagnney Fabiano
| Decision (split)
| APEX: A Night of Champions
| 
| align=center| 3
| align=center| 5:00
| Gatineau, Quebec, Canada
| 
|-
| Loss
| align=center| 25–8–1
| Hatsu Hioki
| Decision (unanimous)
| Pride - Bushido 12
| 
| align=center| 2
| align=center| 5:00
| Nagoya, Japan
| 
|-
| Win
| align=center| 25–7–1
| Charles Bennett
| Submission (armbar)
| KOTC: Redemption on the River
| 
| align=center| 1
| align=center| 3:23
| Moline, Illinois, United States
| 
|-
| Win
| align=center| 24–7–1
| Antonio Carvalho
| Decision (majority)
| IHC 9: Purgatory
| 
| align=center| 3
| align=center| 5:00
| Hammond, Indiana, United States
| Won Shooto Americas Lightweight Championship
|-
| Win
| align=center| 23–7–1
| Steve Kinnison
| Submission (rear-naked choke)
| XFO 6: Judgement Day
| 
| align=center| 3
| align=center| 1:47
| Lakemoor, Illinois, United States
| 
|-
| Win
| align=center| 22–7–1
| Luke Spencer
| Submission (rear-naked choke)
| SuperBrawl 40
| 
| align=center| 2
| align=center| 2:34
| Honolulu, Hawaii, United States
| 
|-
| Win
| align=center| 21–7–1
| David Douglas
| Submission (rear-naked choke)
| IFC: Eve Of Destruction
| 
| align=center| 1
| align=center| 1:39
| Salt Lake City, Utah, United States
| 
|-
| Win
| align=center| 20–7–1
| Jason Dent
| Decision (unanimous)
| Xtreme Fighting Organization 3
| 
| align=center| 3
| align=center| 5:00
| McHenry, Illinois, United States
| 
|-
| Win
| align=center| 19–7–1
| Masahiro Oishi
| Technical Submission (guillotine choke)
| Zst 6
| 
| align=center| 1
| align=center| 0:44
| Tokyo, Japan
| 
|-
| Win
| align=center| 18–7–1
| Kimihito Nonaka
| Submission (rear-naked choke)
| SuperBrawl 35
| 
| align=center| 3
| align=center| 4:35
| Honolulu, Hawaii, United States
| 
|-
| Win
| align=center| 17–7–1
| Dan Swift
| Submission (triangle choke)
| XFO 1: The Kickoff
| 
| align=center| 3
| align=center| 0:44
| Lake Geneva, Wisconsin, United States
| 
|-
| Loss
| align=center| 16–7–1
| Matt Serra
| Decision (unanimous)
| UFC 46
| 
| align=center| 3
| align=center| 5:00
| Las Vegas, Nevada, United States
| 
|-
| Loss
| align=center| 16–6–1
| Norifumi Yamamoto
| Decision (unanimous)
| SuperBrawl 29
| 
| align=center| 3
| align=center| 5:00
| Honolulu, Hawaii, United States
| 
|-
| Win
| align=center| 16–5–1
| Todd Lally
| Submission (triangle choke)
| WFA 3: Level 3
| 
| align=center| 1
| align=center| 4:49
| Las Vegas, Nevada, United States
| 
|-
| Win
| align=center| 15–5–1
| Ryan Ackerman
| Decision (unanimous)
| IHC 5: Tribulation
| 
| align=center| 3
| align=center| 5:00
| Hammond, Indiana, United States
| Won IHC Featherweight Championship
|-
| Win
| align=center| 14–5–1
| Baret Yoshida
| KO (punch)
| UCC Hawaii: Eruption in Hawaii
| 
| align=center| 2
| align=center| 2:08
| Honolulu, Hawaii, United States
| 
|-
| Win
| align=center| 13–5–1
| Bao Quach
| Decision (majority)
| WEC 4
| 
| align=center| 3
| align=center| 5:00
| Uncasville, Connecticut, United States
| 
|-
| Loss
| align=center| 12–5–1
| Ivan Menjivar
| Decision (unanimous)
| UCC 10: Battle for the Belts 2002
| 
| align=center| 3
| align=center| 5:00
| Hull, Quebec, Canada
| 
|-
| Win
| align=center| 12–4–1
| Max Marin
| Submission (triangle choke)
| UA 1: The Genesis
| 
| align=center| 2
| align=center| 3:46
| Hammond, Indiana, United States
| 
|-
| Loss
| align=center| 11–4–1
| Anthony Hamlett
| KO (elbow)
| HOOKnSHOOT: Kings 2
| 
| align=center| 1
| align=center| 0:11
| Evansville, Indiana, United States
| 
|-
| Draw
| align=center| 11–3–1
| Ryoji Yoshizawa
| Draw
| HOOKnSHOOT: Quake
| 
| align=center| 2
| align=center| 5:00
| Evansville, Indiana, United States
| 
|-
| Win
| align=center| 11–3
| Jamie Webb
| Submission (punches)
| Freestyle Combat Challenge 3
| 
| align=center| 1
| align=center| 2:44
| N/A
| 
|-
| Win
| align=center| 10–3
| Tony DeDolph
| Decision (split)
| Extreme Challenge 31
| 
| align=center| 3
| align=center| 5:00
| Kenosha, Wisconsin, United States
| 
|-
| Win
| align=center| 9–3
| Ron Matthews
| Submission (triangle choke)
| Bangkok Brawl
| 
| align=center| N/A
| align=center| N/A
| Chicago, Illinois, United States
| 
|-
| Win
| align=center| 8–3
| Sam Wells
| Submission (triangle choke)
| Midwest Absolute Challenge
| 
| align=center| 1
| align=center| 16:04
| McHenry, Illinois, United States
| 
|-
| Loss
| align=center| 7–3
| Phil Johns
| Submission (strikes)
| Cage Combat 4
| 
| align=center| 1
| align=center| 0:31
| Green Bay, Wisconsin, United States
| 
|-
| Win
| align=center| 7–2
| Jeremy Bolt
| Submission (triangle choke)
| ECC: Extreme Combat Challenge
| 
| align=center| 1
| align=center| 4:30
| Illinois, United States
|
|-
| Loss
| align=center| 6–2
| Phil Johns
| KO (punches)
| HOOKnSHOOT: Rising
| 
| align=center| 1
| align=center| N/A
| Evansville, Indiana, United States
| 
|-
| Win
| align=center| 6–1
| Charles Barron
| Submission (armbar)
| Chicago Challenge 6
| 
| align=center| 1
| align=center| N/A
| Chicago, Illinois, United States
| 
|-
| Win
| align=center| 5–1
| Sam Wells
| Decision
| Freestyle Combat Challenge 1
| 
| align=center| 1
| align=center| 15:00
| N/A
| 
|-
| Win
| align=center| 4–1
| Jeff Rick
| Submission (rear-naked choke)
| HOOKnSHOOT: Trial
| 
| align=center| 1
| align=center| 0:44
| Evansville, Indiana, United States
| 
|-
| Win
| align=center| 3–1
| Larry Koneizka
| Submission (armbar)
| Chicago Challenge 5
| 
| align=center| 1
| align=center| N/A
| Chicago, Illinois, United States
| 
|-
| Win
| align=center| 2–1
| Jason Chambers
| Submission (front choke)
| Chicago Challenge 4
| 
| align=center| 1
| align=center| N/A
| Chicago, Illinois, United States
|
|-
| Win
| align=center| 1–1
| Mike Haltom
| Submission (armbar)
| Extreme Challenge 17
| 
| align=center| 1
| align=center| 2:58
| Indianapolis, Indiana, United States
| 
|-
| Loss
| align=center| 0–1
| Henry Matamoros
| Submission
| Extreme Challenge 13
| 
| align=center| 1
| align=center| 11:13
| Kenosha, Wisconsin, United States
|

ADCC Submission Grappling Record

Professional boxing record

{|class="wikitable" style="text-align:center; font-size:95%"
|-
!
!Result
!Record
!Opponent
!Method
!Round, time
!Date
!Location
!Notes
|-
|5
|Win
|2–2–1
|style="text-align:left;"| Miguel Angel Figueroa
|TKO
|3 (4), 1:38
|Sep 19, 2008
|style="text-align:left;"| 
|style="text-align:left;"|
|-
|4
|Loss
|1–2–1
|style="text-align:left;"| Guadalupe Diaz
|MD
|4
|May 11, 2007
|style="text-align:left;"| 
|style="text-align:left;"|
|-
|3
|Loss
|1–1–1
|style="text-align:left;"| Raul García
|UD
|4
|Jul 21, 2006
|style="text-align:left;"| 
|style="text-align:left;"|
|-
|2
|Draw
|1–0–1
|style="text-align:left;"| Emanuel Hernandez
|PTS
|6
|Apr 21, 2006
|style="text-align:left;"| 
|style="text-align:left;"|
|-
|1
|Win
|1–0
|style="text-align:left;"| Alexis Rubin
|TKO
|4 (4), 2:31
|Apr 20, 2005
|style="text-align:left;"| 
|style="text-align:left;"|

See also
 List of Bellator MMA alumni
 List of mixed martial artists with professional boxing records

References

External links
 
 
 

American male mixed martial artists
Mixed martial artists from Illinois
American practitioners of Brazilian jiu-jitsu
People awarded a black belt in Brazilian jiu-jitsu
Bantamweight mixed martial artists
Featherweight mixed martial artists
Lightweight mixed martial artists
Mixed martial artists utilizing boxing
Mixed martial artists utilizing taekwondo
Mixed martial artists utilizing karate
Mixed martial artists utilizing wrestling
Mixed martial artists utilizing Brazilian jiu-jitsu
American male taekwondo practitioners
American male karateka
Living people
1977 births
People from Crystal Lake, Illinois
Flyweight mixed martial artists
Ultimate Fighting Championship male fighters